A de novo mutation is any mutation/alteration in the genome of any organism (humans, animals, plant, microbes, etc.) that wasn't present or transmitted by their parents. This type of mutation (like any other) occurs spontaneously during the process of DNA replication during cell division in a fetus whose close, biological relatives don't have the mutation. 

Often, these kind of mutations have very little to no effect on the affected organism, but in rare cases they have a notable and/or serious effect on overall health, physical appearance, etc. Disorders that most commonly involve de novo mutations include cri-du-chat syndrome, 1p36 deletion syndrome, genetic cancer syndromes, etc.

Rate 

The average number of spontaneous mutations (not present in the parents) an infant has in its genome is approximately 43.86 DNMs.

A study done in September of 2019 by the University of Utah Health revealed that certain families have a higher spontaneous mutation rate than average, meaning that their newborns had more spontaneous mutations (not present in their parents) than the average newborn, this tendency was found to be hereditary, or to "run in the family".

References 

Mutated genes